Damidu Ashan (born 27 April 1995) is a Sri Lankan cricketer. He made his List A debut for Hambantota District in the 2016–17 Districts One Day Tournament on 24 March 2017.

References

External links
 

1995 births
Living people
Sri Lankan cricketers
Hambantota District cricketers
Kalutara Physical Culture Centre cricketers